The Roman studio of the prolific Italian Baroque painter Carlo Maratta included numerous younger pupils and assistants. Among his many pupils were:

References
See Carlo Maratta article

Maratta